The Truth About 9th Company, officially launched on 18 February 2008 is the first Russian documentary computer game. The game simulates the historical battle for Hill 3234 which took place on 7–8 January 1988 in southern Afghanistan between Soviet paratroop units of the 345th Independent Guards Airborne Regiment and mujahideen.

Plot
The game storyline is divided into seven episodes that illustrate the key points of the battle for Hill 3234. In each episode the player is set the same combat mission that was completed by the real defenders of the hill. Episodes follow one after another according to the progress of events which took place on the battle field.

Development
Dmitry Puchkov, the ideological leader and inspirer of development, and Andrei Kuzmin, the leader of KranX Productions game development studio, researched the details of Operation Magistral and the real circumstances of the Battle for Hill 3234.

Dmitry Puchkov announced the idea of the game as a response to "the intentional destruction of historical memory of the people".

As a result, the in-game mountainous terrain was reconstructed based on satellite imagery, and the progress of events was refined with the help of surviving eyewitnesses.

Reception
The Truth About 9th Company received a mixed reaction from the video game review web sites.

Review web site Absolute Games rated The Truth About 9th Company as bad (35% out of 100%), pointing to a number of serious gameplay issues.

PlayGround.ru game review web site rated The Truth About 9th Company 8.0 out of 10.0, with reviewer demigot saying:

On 22 February 2008, the presentation of The Truth About 9th Company to the participants of the Round Table "Computer games as a new factor in education" within XII World Russian People Council took place in Moscow. The Round Table Director Roman Silantiev noted that the computer games like The Truth About 9th Company "do not only raise patriotism in young people, but also provide objective knowledge of military affairs, history and geography". He emphasized that combat operations are reproduced within the game exactly, while it's possible to play only for the one side according to the game rules.

Notes

External links
 Official "The Truth About 9th Company" website 
 Extreme Developers official web site 
 KranX Productions official web site
 "The Truth About 9th Company" gameplay video, commented by Dmitry Puchkov 

1C Company games
History educational video games
Europe-exclusive video games
First-person shooters
Tactical shooter video games
2008 video games
Video games developed in Russia
Windows games
Windows-only games
Video games set in 1988
Video games set in Afghanistan
Soviet–Afghan War video games
Cold War video games